Hammond High Magnet School, founded in 1866, is a public high school located in an unincorporated part of the 7th Ward of Tangipahoa Parish, Louisiana, United States, east of Hammond.  It is the second-largest high school in the Tangipahoa Parish Public School System. Until the end of academic year 2010-11 it was known as Hammond High School but became Hammond Magnet High School on being so reconstituted and designated by the Tangipahoa Parish School System.
The mascot is the Tornado, and the school colors are purple and white.  As of the 2022-2023 school year, Hammond High's principal is Micheal Kyle. The school enrolls students from Hammond and the surrounding area within Tangipahoa Parish because of the presence of the Magnet program and International Baccalaureate program.

History
Originally located between East Thomas Street (US 190, then a two-way road) and Morris Street (the building became Eastside Elementary School and later the Eastside Apartments), the school moved to a location on the south side of West Morris Street (US 190, now eastbound only) shortly after World War I; the West Morris Street site is now the world headquarters of Neill Corporation. In the Morris Street location, although the vernacular name was Hammond High School, officially it was "Annie Eastman High School" in commemoration of a former teacher. In the late 1960s the school relocated to a site north of University Avenue (LA 3234)—now the North Campus of Southeastern Louisiana University. From there Hammond High moved to its current location on LA 1064 (River Road).

Linus A. Sims (1882-1949) was appointed the principal of Hammond High School in 1923. Two years later, he started Hammond Junior College in a wing of the high school, then on the south side of West Morris Street. In 1928, the junior college, under Sims's leadership, became the future Southeastern Louisiana University (then College).

School uniforms
All students are required to wear khaki pants or shorts paired with a white, purple, or navy polo shirt.  school uniforms.

Extra-curricular activities
Hammond High Magnet School (HHMS) offers extracurricular activities including Robotics, Key Club, Beta Club, and Math Club.

Athletics
Hammond High athletics competes in the LHSAA. 

The school sponsors football, volleyball, soccer, softball, swim, tennis, and track and field. Hammond's chief rival is the Ponchatoula Green Wave.

Championships
Football championships
(1) State Championship: 1970

Notable alumni
 
Warren Bankston, Class of 1965, football player
Jacob Brumfield, Former MLB player (Cincinnati Reds, Pittsburgh Pirates, Toronto Blue Jays, Los Angeles Dodgers)
Raymond Michael Clausen Jr. (1947-2004), HHS Class of 1965, USMC, Medal of Honor recipient for heroism in Vietnam.
John Desmond, who opened the first architectural firm in Hammond in 1953, graduated from Hammond High School in 1937. He designed many of the public buildings in Baton Rouge.
Barbara Forrest, philosophy professor in Southeastern Louisiana University and opponent of Intelligent Design.
Kim Mulkey, Class of 1980, current head coach of LSU women's basketball team; won national championship as a player at Louisiana Tech and gold medal at the 1984 Summer Olympics.
Robert Alford, Class of 2008, Southeastern Louisiana Lions football player; 2nd round draft pick (2013) and six year starter at CB for the Atlanta Falcons; currently with the Arizona Cardinals.
Brad Davis, Class of 1971, played football at Louisiana State University from 1971 to 1974, and with the Atlanta Falcons of the NFL in 1975-76.

Extra-curricular activities
Hammond High Magnet School (HHMS) offers extracurricular activities including Robotics, Key Club, Beta Club, and Math Club.

References

External links

Hammond High School

Hammond, Louisiana
Hammond High School (Louisiana) alumni
Public high schools in Louisiana
Schools in Tangipahoa Parish, Louisiana
Magnet schools in Louisiana